The chess events at the 2003 All-Africa Games were held from 5 to 17 October at the Nicon Hilton Hotel in Abuja. This was the first time chess was contested at the All-Africa Games. Teams played matches on four : each team consisted of a minimum of four players and up to two optional reserve players. In the team competitions, medals were awarded to the teams scoring the highest number of board points, as well as to individual players with the best performances on each board in terms of win percentage.

Eleven men's teams played a round-robin tournament held from 5 to 15 October. Sierra Leone registered a twelfth team but withdrew for not having enough players. Egypt won the team gold medal scoring 31½ board points despite losing their match against Algeria, who scored 28½ board points to win the team silver medal. Zambia took the bronze medal with 27 board points, although they scored more match points (+8=1–1) than Egypt (+7=2–1) or Algeria (+7=1–2).

Four women's teams representing Algeria, Botswana, Nigeria and South Africa played a double round-robin held from 5 to 12 October. Algeria won the team gold medal scoring 19½ board points while South Africa scored 15 board points to win the team silver medal. Host nation Nigeria placed a distant third with seven board points and took bronze.

The men's and women's individual blitz competitions took place on 16 and 17 October. Each country was allowed to enter a maximum of three players into each blitz tournament, which were run using the Swiss system. In the nine-round men's tournament, Egypt's Fouad El-Taher won the gold medal on cumulative tiebreaks over his compatriot Ahmed Adly and Angola's Pedro Aderito after all three players scored seven points. In the seven-round women's tournament, Algeria's Farida Arouche won the gold medal scoring 5½ points, while South Africa's Cecile Van Der Merwe took silver and Algeria's Asma Houli took bronze.

Abuja also hosted the 2003 African Individual Chess Championships held concurrently with the All-Africa Games on 10 to 17 October. Many players participated in both competitions.

Shortly after the Games, Egypt's first reserve player Esam Aly Ahmed and team manager Mohammed Labib both died of cerebral malaria contracted in Abuja, after their illness was misdiagnosed in Egypt.

Participating nations

Medal summary

Medal table

References

2003 All-Africa Games
2003
All-Africa Games
2003 All-Africa Games